This is a list of parks and nature reserves that are locations in the South section of the Great Florida Birding Trail.

Locations include sites in Broward, Charlotte, Collier, DeSoto, Glades, Hendry, Lee, Martin, Monroe, Miami-Dade, Palm Beach and Sarasota counties.

Myakka River Cluster
 Quick Point Nature Preserve
 Arlington Park (Sarasota, Florida)
 Pinecraft Park
 Celery Fields
 Crowley Museum and Nature Center
 Myakka River State Park
 Red Bug Slough Preserve
 Siesta Beach
 Oscar Scherer State Park
 T. Mabry Carlton, Jr. Memorial Reserve
 Jelks Preserve

Sandpiper Cluster
 Venice Area Audubon Rookery
 Shamrock Park and Nature Center
 Casperson Beach
 Lemon Bay Park
 Blind Pass Beach Park
 Indian Mound Park, Florida
 Cedar Point Environmental Park
 Amberjack Environmental Park
 Tippecanoe Environmental Park

Charlotte Harbor Cluster
 Charlotte Harbor Preserve State Park: Old Datsun Trail
 Fred C. Babcock/Cecil M. Webb Wildlife Management Area
 Charlotte Flatwoods Environmental Park
 Charlotte Harbor Preserve State Park: North Cape Flats Trail

Piping Plover Cluster
 Charlotte Harbor Preserve State Park: Little Pine Island
 Cayo Costa State Park
 J.N. 'Ding' Darling National Wildlife Refuge
 Lighthouse Park
 Rotary Park
 Lakes Regional Park
 San Carlos Bay: Bunche Beach Preserve
 Bowditch Point Regional Preserve
 Matanzas Pass Preserve
 Little Estero Island Critical Wildlife Area

Wood Stork Cluster
 Lovers Key State Park
 Estero Bay Preserve State Park
 Six Mile Cypress Slough Preserve
 Hickey's Creek Mitigation Park
 Caloosahatchee Regional Park
 CREW Marsh Hiking Trails
 Corkscrew Swamp Sanctuary

Short-tailed Hawk Cluster
 Fisheating Creek Wildlife Management Area- East
 Fisheating Creek Wildlife Management Area- West
 Okaloacooches Slough State Forest and Wildlife Management Area
 Dinner Island Ranch Wildlife Management Area
 Storm Water Treatment Area Five

Okeechobee Cluster
 Storm Water Treatment Area One - West
 Royal Palm Beach Pines Natural Area
 City of West Palm Beach Grassy Waters Preserve
 Sweetbay Natural Area
 J.W. Corbett Wildlife Management Area
 John C. and Mariana Jones/ Hungryland Wildlife and Environmental Area
 DuPuis Wildlife and Environmental Area
 Lake Okeechobee Ridge: Rafael E. Sanches Trail
 Hawk's Hammock
 Halpatiokee Regional Park
 Kiplinger Parcel

Spoonbill and Scrub-Jay Cluster
 Rocky Point Hammock
 St. Lucie Inlet Preserve State Park
 Peck Lake Park
 Hobe Sound National Wildlife Refuge
 Jonathan Dickinson State Park
 Jupiter Ridge Natural Area
 Frenchman's Forest Natural Area
 Juno Dunes Natural Area
 John D. MacArthur Beach State Park

Mangrove Cluster
 Delnore-Wiggins Pass State Park
 Conservancy Nature Center
 Eagle Lake Park
 Picayune Strand State Forest: Sabal Palm Hiking Trail
 Rookery Bay National Estuarine Research Reserve
 Tigertail Beach
 Collier-Seminole State Park

Cypress Cluster
 Fakahatchee Strand Preserve State Park
 Everglades National Park: Gulf Coast Visitor Center
 Big Cypress National Preserve

Snail Kite Cluster
 Everglades National Park: Shark Valley Visitor Center
 Holey Land/ Rotenburger Wildlife Management Areas
 Everglades and Francis S. Taylor Wildlife Management Area

Whistling-Duck and Wetland Cluster
 Arthur R. Marshall Loxahatchee National Wildlife Refuge
 Green Cay Wetlands
 Wakodahatchee Wetlands
 Seacrest Scrub Natural Area
 Delray Oaks Natural Area
 Spanish River Park
 Gumbo Limbo Nature Center

Night-Heron and Burrowing Owl Cluster
 Fern Forest Nature Center
 Easterlin Park
 Hugh Taylor Birch State Park
 John U. Lloyd Beach State Park
 West Lake Park and Ann Kolb Nature Center
 Tree Tops Park and Pine Island Ridge Natural Area
 Brian Piccolo Park
 Snake Warrior's Island Natural Area
 Greynolds Park

Cuckoo Cluster
 A. D. Barnes Park
 Crandon Park: Bear Cut Preserve
 Bill Baggs Cape Florida State Park
 Matheson Hammock Park
 The Deering Estate at Cutler

Pine Rockland Cluster
 Castellow Hammock Preserve
 Biscayne National Park: Convoy Point
 Everglades National Park: Main Entrance
 Southern Glades Wildlife and Environmental Area
 Frog Pond Wildlife Management Area "Lucky Hammock"
 Dagny Johnson Key Largo Hammock Botanical State Park
 John Pennekamp Coral Reef State Park

White-crowned Pigeon Cluster
 Long Key State Park
 Curry Hammock State Park
 Crane Point Museums and Nature Center
 Bahia Honda State Park
 National Key Deer Refuge: Blue Hole and Jack Watson Trails

Key West and Tortugas Cluster
 Key West Tropical Forest & Botanical Garden
 Fort Zachary Taylor Historic State Park
 Dry Tortugas National Park

References

 South Florida Birding Trail Guide, printed by the Florida Fish and Wildlife Conservation Commission.

Great Florida Birding Trail
Great Florida Birding Trail